Fairey Gyrodyne can refer to:

 Fairey Jet Gyrodyne
Fairey FB-1 Gyrodyne